Simurali railway station is a railway station on the Sealdah–Ranaghat line. It serves the local areas of Shimurali in the Nadia district of West Bengal.

History
The Sealdah–Kusthia line of the Eastern Bengal Railway was opened to railway traffic in the year 1862. Eastern Bengal Railway used to work only on the eastern side of the Hooghly River.

Station complex
The platform is not at all sheltered. It lacks many facilities including water and sanitation. There is no proper approach road to this station.

Electrification
The Sealdah–Ranaghat sector was electrified in 1963–65.

References

External links

 

Sealdah railway division
Kolkata Suburban Railway stations
1862 establishments in India
Railway stations in Nadia district